Sixth Lake is a lake located by Inlet, New York. It is part of the Fulton Chain Lakes. The inlet is connected to Seventh Lake by a channel and the outlet is connected to Fifth Lake by a creek. Fish species present in the lake are brown trout, lake whitefish, lake trout, smelt, splake, rainbow trout, white sucker, black bullhead, yellow perch, and pumpkinseed sunfish. There is access via a channel from Seventh Lake.

References 

Lakes of New York (state)
Lakes of Hamilton County, New York